Nashiro is a Japanese surname. Notable people with the surname include:

, Japanese boxer
, Japanese kickboxer

Japanese-language surnames